Mexican Flora and Fauna Protection Areas (Áreas de Protección de Flora y Fauna in Spanish) comprise 29 protected natural areas of Mexico administrated by the National Commission of Protected Natural Areas (Comisión Nacional de Áreas Naturales Protegidas, or CONANP), an agency of the federal government.

They are areas established to conform to the regulations provided by the LGEEPA and other applicable laws on places that contain habitats for which their existence depends on their preservation, transformation, and support of the species of flora and fauna .

List of Mexican Flora and Fauna Protection Areas

Baja California
 Valle de los Cirios
 Islas del Golfo de California (Islands of the Gulf of California)  (also in Baja California Sur, Sonora, and Sinaloa)

Baja California Sur
 Balandra
 Cabo San Lucas

Campeche
 Laguna de Términos

Chiapas
 Cascada de Agua Azul
 Chan-Kin
 Metzabok
 Nahá

Chihuahua
 Campo Verde
 Cañón de Santa Elena
 Cerro Mohinora
 Médanos de Samalayuca
 Papigochic
 Tutuaca

Coahuila
 Cuatrociénegas
 Maderas del Carmen
 Ocampo

Colima
 El Jabalí

Jalisco
 La Primavera
 Sierra de Quila

Estado de México
 Ciénegas del Lerma
 Nevado de Toluca

Michoacán
 Pico de Tancítaro

Morelos
 Corredor Biológico Chichinautzin (also in Distrito Federal)

Oaxaca
 Boquerón de Tonalá

Quintana Roo
 Bala'an Ka'ax
 Cozumel
 Manglares de Nichupté
 Uaymil
 Yum Balam

San Luis Potosí
 Sierra La Mojonera
 Sierra de Álvarez

Sinaloa
 Meseta de Cacaxtla

Sonora
 Sierra de Álamos-Río Cuchujaqui
 Bavispe

Tabasco
 Cañón del Usumacinta

Tamaulipas
 Laguna Madre and Río Bravo Delta
 Sierra de Tamaulipas

Veracruz
 Sistema Arrecifal Lobos-Tuxpan

Yucatán
 Otoch Ma´Ax Yetel Kooh (also in Quintana Roo)

 
Nature conservation in Mexico
Protected areas of Mexico
.
.
Geography of Mexico
Environment of Mexico
Natural history of Mexico